On Leaving is the fourth album by American singer-songwriter Nina Nastasia. It was released on September 11, 2006, on Fat Cat Records. It was recorded by Steve Albini and produced by Nastasia, Kennan Gudjonsson, and Albini. The album received generally favorable reviews; Allmusic considered the album a "deeply poetic record." Stylus Magazine commented the album was "full bodied and masterful, overshadowing many big-footed leading ladies’ recent folk releases." Pitchfork Media found it "difficult to hear Nastasia pull back to a songwriter-with-guitar style."

Track listing
Jim's Room 
Brad Haunts a Party
Our Day Trip 
Counting Up Your Bones
Dumb I Am
Why Don't You Stay Home
One Old Woman
Treehouse Song
Lee
Settling Song
Bird of Cuzco
If We Go to the West

Recording information

Engineered by Steve Albini at Electrical Audio in Chicago.

References

External links
Fat Cat announcement

2006 albums
Albums produced by Steve Albini
FatCat Records albums
Nina Nastasia albums